Natalya Anisimova (born May 8, 1973) is a Russian track and field athlete who competed mainly in the 100 metres. She won the 4 × 100 metres relay silver medal for Russia at the 1994 European Athletics Championships with her team mates Marina Trandenkova, Galina Malchugina and Irina Privalova. In 1996 she also won the national indoor championship in 60 metres.

Personal records

 60 m (Indoor): 7.14 seconds, 23 February 1996, Moscow
 100 m: 11.23 seconds, 2 July 1996, Saint-Petersburg

National titles
Russian Indoor Athletics Championships
60 metres: 1996

See also
List of European Athletics Championships medalists (women)

References

 

1973 births
Living people
Russian female sprinters
European Athletics Championships medalists
Universiade silver medalists for Russia
Universiade medalists in athletics (track and field)